(R)-citramalate synthase (CimA) is an enzyme. This enzyme catalyses the following chemical reaction

 acetyl-CoA + pyruvate + H2O  CoA + (2R)-2-hydroxy-2-methylbutanedioate

This enzyme participates in a novel pyruvate pathway for isoleucine biosynthesis.

References

External links 
 

EC 2.3.1